West Carleton Secondary School is a secondary school situated in the rural west end of Ottawa, Ontario, Canada. The school is under the jurisdiction of the Ottawa Carleton District School Board.

Expansions and renovations 
The secondary school received a significant addition in February 2018, adding room for an additional 250 students with new classrooms and specialty rooms, including a new dance room and gym. Construction began in the summer of 2017 was completed in early 2018. The addition was estimated to cost approximately 7.8 million dollars, and in total added; nine classrooms (including one classroom dedicated to science & technologies studies), two new arts classrooms, a new gymnasium including a gender-neutral washroom and change rooms, and department offices for teachers. The gender neutral washroom has since been replaced as a staff bathroom.

Alumni 
 Samantha Cornett, squash player
 Corey Johnson, basketball player
 Cameron Smedley, canoe slalom athlete
 Todd White, hockey player

See also
List of high schools in Ontario

References

External links
School Website
OCDSB Website
2009-2010 OCDSB School Profile

High schools in Ottawa
Educational institutions established in 1989
1989 establishments in Ontario